Fraenkel Gallery is a contemporary art gallery in San Francisco founded by Jeffrey Fraenkel in 1979. Frish Brandt, president of the gallery, joined in 1985.

Fraenkel Gallery has presented more than 350 exhibitions, with a focus on photography and its relation to other arts including painting, drawing, sculpture, and video. The gallery’s mission is to expand the conversation around photography by bringing together work by artists across all media. Fraenkel Gallery’s exhibitions have spanned photography's history while exploring the medium’s role in the evolution of art, highlighting links between early photographic pioneers and multi-disciplinary artists of today. The gallery works to build personal connections in diverse arts communities, and emphasizes its commitment to the pleasures and rewards of viewing art in person. The gallery maintains a robust publishing program, producing more than 66 books and a wide range of posters to date, including titles that accompany specific exhibitions and coincide with anniversaries.

History
Jeffrey Fraenkel opened Fraenkel Gallery on 11 September 1979 at 55 Grant Avenue, San Francisco. Frish Brandt joined Fraenkel Gallery in 1985, and became a partner in 1989. In 2015, Brandt was named president of the gallery.

Fraenkel Gallery’s inaugural exhibition featured 19th-century photographs of California by Carleton Watkins. In the gallery’s first decade, it brought new attention to under-recognized photographs by seldom-exhibited 19th-century artists including Watkins, Timothy O’Sullivan, Anna Atkins, and Eadweard Muybridge. Fraenkel Gallery’s second exhibition featured Lee Friedlander, and the gallery soon began showing work by other significant 20th-century artists, including Walker Evans, Robert Frank, Helen Levitt, Diane Arbus, Robert Adams, Garry Winogrand, and Bruce Conner.

Two years after the 1989 Loma Prieta earthquake, Fraenkel Gallery moved to a larger space at 49 Geary Street, one block from their first location. The gallery expanded the range of artworks and media featured in exhibitions and books, and presented solo shows by artists including Nan Goldin, Hiroshi Sugimoto, Sophie Calle, Richard Avedon, Sol LeWitt, Gilbert & George, Jay DeFeo, and Bernd and Hilla Becher, as well as group shows encompassing sculpture, drawing, and mixed media.

In the 2000s, Fraenkel Gallery began to feature more artists working outside of photography, and exhibitions during this decade included Edward Hopper & Company, Nothing and Everything: Painting, Photography, Drawing & Sculpture 1896–2006, and Not Exactly Photographs. The gallery also added Katy Grannan, Peter Hujar, Christian Marclay, and Ralph Eugene Meatyard to its roster, and began participating in international art fairs including Art Basel and Paris Photo.

In the 2010s, Fraenkel Gallery exhibited an increasingly wider swath of multi-disciplinary work, as well as video, sculpture, paintings, film posters, and record albums. The gallery added younger artists to its roster, including Alec Soth, Richard T. Walker, Wardell Milan, Elisheva Biernoff, and Richard Learoyd, as well as those working in a range of media, such as Janet Cardiff & George Bures Miller and Mel Bochner. The satellite space FraenkelLAB, at 1632 Market Street in San Francisco, ran from 2016 through 2017 with a diverse and experimental program. The inaugural exhibition, Home Improvements, was curated by John Waters, and subsequent exhibitions included the work of Richard T. Waker,  David Benjamin Sherry,  Sophie Calle, Katy Grannan, Alec Soth and others.

Artists or their estates represented by Fraenkel Gallery

Publications (selected)

Photography in Spain in the Nineteenth Century. Text by Lee Fontanella. San Francisco and London: Fraenkel and Delahunty Gallery, 1983
The Insistent Object: Photographs of 1845-1986. San Francisco: Fraenkel, 1987
Carleton E. Watkins: Photographs 1861-1874.  San Francisco: Fraenkel, 1989
The Kiss of Apollo: Photography and Sculpture—1845 to the Present. Essay by Eugenia Parry Janis. San Francisco: Fraenkel, 1991
Bill Dane’s History of the Universe. San Francisco: Fraenkel, 1992
Henry Wessel: House Pictures. San Francisco: Fraenkel, 1992
Under the Sun: Photographs by Christopher Bucklow, Susan Derges, Garry Fabian-Miller, and Adam Fuss. Essay by David Alan Melor. San Francisco: Fraenkel, 1996
Open Secrets: Seventy Pictures on Paper 1815 to the Present. San Francisco: Fraenkel; Matthew Marks Gallery, 1997
Dust Breeding: Photographs, Sculpture & Film. Introduction by Steve Wolfe. San Francisco: Fraenkel, 1998
David Smith: Photographs 1931-1965. Introduction by Rosalind E. Krauss, essay by Joan Pachner. San Francisco and New York: Fraenkel and Matthew Marks, 1998
Lee Friedlander: Self Portrait. Afterword by John Szarkowski. San Francisco and New York: Fraenkel and D.A.P., 1998
San Francisco Album: George Robinson Fardon—Photographs 1854-1856. Essays by Peter E. Palmquist, Rodger C. Birt, and Joan M. Schwartz. Catalogue Raisonné by Marvin Nathan. San Francisco and New York: Fraenkel and Hans P. Kraus Jr., 1999
The Man in the Crowd. The Uneasy Streets of Garry Winogrand. Introduction by Fran Lebowitz, essay by Ben Lifson. San Francisco and New York: Fraenkel and D.A.P., 1999
Susan Derges: Woman Thinking River. Introduction by Mark Haworth-Booth, essay by Charlotte Cotton. San Francisco and New York: Fraenkel and Danziger, 1999
California: Views by Robert Adams of the Los Angeles Basin, 1978-1983. Afterword by Robert Hass. San Francisco and New York: Fraenkel and Matthew Marks, 2000
Lee Friedlander. San Francisco: Fraenkel, 2000
Lee Friedlander: The Little Screens. Introduction by Walker Evans. San Francisco: Fraenkel, 2001
Richard Avedon: Made in France. Essay by Judith Thurman. San Francisco: Fraenkel, 2001
Lee Friedlander: Kitaj. Introduction by Maria Friedlander, with postscript by R.B. Kitaj. San Francisco: Fraenkel, 2002
Diane Arbus: The Libraries. San Francisco: Fraenkel, 2004
Lee Friedlander: Family. Introduction by Maria Friedlander. San Francisco: Fraenkel, 2004
Lee Friedlander: Sticks and Stones. Essay by James Enyeart. San Francisco and New York: Fraenkel and D.A.P., 2004
Peter Hujar: Night. Essay by Bob Nickas. San Francisco and New York: Fraenkel and Matthew Marks, 2005
Robert Adams: Turning Back. San Francisco and New York: Fraenkel and Matthew Marks, 2005
Lee Friedlander: Apples and Olives. San Francisco and Göteborg: Fraenkel and Hasselblad Center, 2005
Richard Misrach: Chronologies. San Francisco: Fraenkel, 2005
Lee Friedlander: Cherry Blossom Time in Japan. San Francisco: Fraenkel, 2006
Eye of the Beholder: Photographs from the Collection of Richard Avedon. San Francisco: Fraenkel, 2006
Nothing and Everything. San Francisco and New York: Fraenkel and Peter Freeman, Inc., 2006
The Book of Shadows. San Francisco: Fraenkel Gallery, 2007
Katy Grannan: The Westerners. San Francisco and New York: Fraenkel, Greenberg Van Doren Gallery and Salon 94 Freemans, 2007
73 Photographs from David and Mary Robinson at the National Gallery of Art. Essays by David Robinson and Sarah Greenough, with an afterword by Jeffrey Fraenkel. San Francisco: Fraenkel, 2007
Christian Marclay: Stereo. San Francisco: Fraenkel, 2008
Edward Hopper & Company, San Francisco: Fraenkel Gallery, 2009
Nicholas Nixon: Live Love Look Last. San Francisco, New York and Göttingen: Fraenkel, Pace/MacGill Gallery and Steidl, 2009
Lee Friedlander: America by Car. San Francisco and New York: Fraenkel and D.A.P., 2010
Mel Bochner: Photographs and Not Photographs. San Francisco: Fraenkel, 2010
Katy Grannan: Boulevard. San Francisco & New York: Fraenkel Gallery & Salon 94, 2011
Lee Friedlander: The New Cars 1964. San Francisco: Fraenkel, 2011
Richard Learoyd: Presences. San Francisco: Fraenkel, 2011
Robert Adams: Prairie. Essay by Eric Paddock. San Francisco: Fraenkel, 2011
Lee Friedlander: Mannequin. San Francisco: Fraenkel, 2012
Robert Adams: Light Balances & On Any Given Day in Spring. Text by Robert Adams. San Francisco and New York: Fraenkel and Matthew Marks, 2012
The Unphotographable. Edited by Jeffrey Fraenkel. San Francisco: Fraenkel, 2013. 
Christian Marclay: Things I’ve Heard. Interview with Christian Marclay. San Francisco and New York: Fraenkel and Paula Cooper Gallery, 2013
Richard Misrach: 1.21.11 5:40pm. San Francisco: Fraenkel, 2013
Peter Hujar: Love & Lust. Interview with Fran Lebowitz and essay by Vince Aletti. San Francisco: Fraenkel, 2014
Katy Grannan: The Ninety Nine and The Nine. San Francisco and New York: Fraenkel and Salon 94, 2014
John Gossage: Who Do You Love. San Francisco: Fraenkel, 2014
Robert Adams: A Road Through Shore Pine. San Francisco: Fraenkel, 2014
Nicholas Nixon: About Forty Years. San Francisco: Fraenkel, 2015
Silent Dialogues: Diane Arbus & Howard Nemerov. Text by Alexander Nemerov. San Francisco: Fraenkel, 2015
Robert Adams: Around the House. San Francisco: Fraenkel, 2016
Ralph Eugene Meatyard: American Mystic. Text by Alexander Nemerov. San Francisco: Fraenkel, 2017
Elisheva Biernoff. San Francisco: Fraenkel, 2017
Robert Adams: Tenancy. San Francisco: Fraenkel, 2017
Art & Vinyl. San Francisco: Fraenkel, 2018
Robert Adams: 27 Roads. San Francisco: Fraenkel, 2018
Lee Friedlander: SIGNS. San Francisco: Fraenkel Gallery, 2019

Anniversary publications
Seeing Things. San Francisco: Fraenkel, 1995. . Published to coincide with the gallery's fifteenth anniversary.
20Twenty. San Francisco: Fraenkel, 1999. . Published to coincide with the gallery's twentieth anniversary.
The Eye Club. San Francisco: Fraenkel, 2003. . Edited by Jeffrey Fraenkel. Text by Jeffrey Fraenkel and Frish Brandt. Published to coincide with the gallery's twenty fifth anniversary.
Furthermore. San Francisco: Fraenkel, 2009. . Published to coincide with the gallery's thirtieth anniversary.
The Plot Thickens. San Francisco: Fraenkel, 2014. . Edited and with an introduction by Jeffrey Fraenkel. Published to coincide with the gallery's thirty fifth anniversary.
Long Story Short, San Francisco, Fraenkel Gallery, 2019. Edited by Jeffrey Fraenkel and Frish Brandt. Published to coincide with the gallery's fortieth anniversary.

See also
The McLoughlin Gallery was also at 49 Geary Street

References

External links

Art museums and galleries in San Francisco
Art galleries established in 1979
1979 establishments in California
Contemporary art galleries in the United States